Alirajpur Assembly constituency is one of the 230 Vidhan Sabha (Legislative Assembly) constituencies of Madhya Pradesh state in central India. This constituency came into existence in 1951, as one of the 79 Vidhan Sabha constituencies of the erstwhile Madhya Bharat state. This constituency is reserved for the candidates belonging to the Scheduled tribes since its inception.

Overview
Alirajpur (constituency number 191) is one of the two Vidhan Sabha constituencies located in Alirajpur district. This constituency covers the Alirajpur municipality and part of Alirajpur tehsil of this district.

Alirajpur is part of Ratlam Lok Sabha constituency along with seven other Vidhan Sabha segments, namely, Jobat in this district, Jhabua, Thandla and Petlawad in Jhabua district and Ratlam Rural, Ratlam City and Sailana in Ratlam district.

Members of Legislative Assembly
As a constituency of Madhya Bharat:
 1951: Bhima, Socialist Party

As a constituency of Madhya Pradesh:
 1957: Chatrarsingh, Indian National Congress
 1962: Bhagirath Bhanwar, Socialist Party
 1967: Chhitusingh, Indian National Congress
 1972: Magan Singh Patel, Indian National Congress
 1977: Bhagwan Singh Chauhan, Janata Party
 1980: Magan Singh Patel, Indian National Congress (I)
 1985: Magan Singh Patel, Indian National Congress
 1990: Magan Singh Patel, Indian National Congress
 1993: Magan Singh Patel, Indian National Congress
 1998-1999: Magan Singh Patel, Indian National Congress (died during his reign)
 1999-2003: Vesta Singh Patel (Rawat), Indian National Congress
 2003: Nagar Singh Chouhan, Bharatiya Janata Party
 2008: Nagar Singh Chouhan, Bharatiya Janata Party
 2013: Nagar Singh Chouhan, Bharatiya Janata Party

See also
 Alirajpur
 Niranjan Singh Patel

References

Alirajpur district
Assembly constituencies of Madhya Pradesh